is a Japanese middle-distance runner. He competed in the men's 1500 metres at the 1964 Summer Olympics.

References

1941 births
Living people
Athletes (track and field) at the 1964 Summer Olympics
Japanese male middle-distance runners
Olympic athletes of Japan
Place of birth missing (living people)